Aphra sanguipalpis is a moth of the subfamily Arctiinae. It was described by Paul Dognin in 1907. It found in Peru.

References

Moths described in 1907
Arctiinae
Moths of South America